Lisa Hildegard Badum (born 2 October 1983) is a German politician of Alliance 90/The Greens. She has been a member of the Bundestag since the 2017 German federal election, after two failed attempts.

Early life and education
From 2003 to 2010, Badum studied political science at the University of Bamberg.

Political career
Badum has been a member of the German Bundestag since the 2017 elections. She stood for election in the Bamberg constituency and was elected via her party's statewide list. 

In parliament, Badum has since been serving on the Committee on the Environment, Nature Conservation, Building and Nuclear Safety. She is also her parliamentary group's spokesperson on climate policy. Since 2022, she has been chairing the Subcommittee on International Climate and Energy Policy.

Other activities
 German-Israeli Society, Member of the Board (since 2022) 
 German Federation for the Environment and Nature Conservation (BUND), Member
 Terre des Femmes, Member

References

External links 
Personal webpage

Living people
1983 births
Members of the Bundestag for Bavaria
Female members of the Bundestag
21st-century German women politicians
University of Bamberg alumni
Members of the Bundestag 2017–2021
Members of the Bundestag 2021–2025
Members of the Bundestag for Alliance 90/The Greens
People from Forchheim